The 1918 United Kingdom general election was called immediately after the Armistice with Germany which ended the First World War, and was held on Saturday, 14 December 1918. The governing coalition, under Prime Minister David Lloyd George, sent letters of endorsement to candidates who supported the coalition government. These were nicknamed "Coalition Coupons", and led to the election being known as the "coupon election". The result was a massive landslide in favour of the coalition, comprising primarily the Conservatives and Coalition Liberals, with massive losses for Liberals who were not endorsed. Nearly all the Liberal MPs without coupons were defeated, including party leader H. H. Asquith.

It was the first general election to include on a single day all eligible voters of the United Kingdom, although the vote count was delayed until 28 December so that the ballots cast by soldiers serving overseas could be included in the tallies.

It resulted in a landslide victory for the coalition government of David Lloyd George, who had replaced H. H. Asquith as Prime Minister in December 1916. They were both Liberals and continued to battle for control of the party, which was rapidly losing popular support and never regained power.

It was the first general election to be held after enactment of the Representation of the People Act 1918. It was thus the first election in which women over the age of 30, and all men over the age of 21, could vote. Previously, all women and many poor men had been excluded from voting.  Women generally supported the coalition candidates.

It was the first parliamentary election in which women were able to stand as candidates following the Parliament (Qualification of Women) Act 1918, believed to be one of the shortest Acts of Parliament ever given Royal Assent. The Act was passed shortly before Parliament was dissolved. It followed a report by Law Officers that the Great Reform Act 1832 had specified parliamentary candidates had to be male and that the Representation of the People Act passed earlier in the year did not change that. One woman, Nina Boyle, had already presented herself for a by-election earlier in the year in Keighley but had been turned down by the returning officer on technical grounds.

The election was also noted for the dramatic result in Ireland, which showed clear disapproval of government policy. The Irish Parliamentary Party were almost completely wiped out by the Irish republican party Sinn Féin, who vowed in their manifesto to establish an independent Irish Republic. They refused to take their seats in Westminster, instead forming a breakaway government and declaring Irish independence. The Irish War of Independence began soon after the election.  Because of the resulting partition of Ireland, this was the last United Kingdom general election to include the entire island of Ireland.

 
Numbers and names of Members returned

Background
Lloyd George's coalition government was supported by a minority (majority after the election) of the Liberals and Bonar Law's Conservatives. However, the election saw a split in the Liberal Party between those who were aligned with Lloyd George and the government and those who were aligned with Asquith, the party's official leader.

On 14 November it was announced that Parliament, which had been sitting since 1910 and had been extended by emergency wartime action, would dissolve on 25 November, with elections on 14 December.

Following confidential negotiations over the summer of 1918, it was agreed that certain candidates were to be offered the support of the Prime Minister and the leader of the Conservative Party at the next general election. To these candidates a letter, known as the Coalition Coupon, was sent, indicating the government's endorsement of their candidacy. 159 Liberal, 364 Conservative, 20 National Democratic and Labour, and 2 Coalition Labour candidates received the coupon. For this reason, the election is often called the Coupon Election.

80 Conservative candidates stood without a coupon. Of these, 35 candidates were Irish Unionists. Of the other non-couponed Conservative candidates, only 23 stood against a Coalition candidate; the remaining 22 candidates stood in areas where there were no coupons, or refused the offer of a coupon.

The Labour Party, led by William Adamson, fought the election independently, as did those Liberals who did not receive a coupon.

The election was not chiefly fought over what peace to make with Germany, although those issues played a role.  More important was the voters' evaluation of Lloyd George in terms of what he had accomplished so far and what he promised for the future. His supporters emphasised that he had won the Great War. Against his strong record in social legislation, he called for making "a country fit for heroes to live in".

This election was also known as a khaki election, due to the immediate postwar setting and the role of the demobilised soldiers.

Coalition victory
The coalition won the election easily, with the Conservatives the big winners. They were the largest party in the governing majority. Lloyd George remained Prime Minister, despite the Conservatives outnumbering his pro-coalition Liberals and had a majority in their own right. The Conservatives welcomed his leadership on foreign policy as the Paris Peace talks began a few weeks after the election.

An additional 47 Conservatives, 23 of whom were Irish Unionists, won without the coupon but did not act as a separate block or oppose the government except on the issue of Irish independence.

While most of the pro-coalition Liberals were re-elected, the Independent Liberal faction was reduced to a handful of MPs, not all of whom were opponents of the coalition. Asquith and the other leaders lost their seats, and only three with junior ministerial experience were elected. According to Trevor Wilson's book, The Downfall of the Liberal Party, 136 couponed Liberals were elected, whereas only 29 who did not receive the coupon were returned to Parliament, but as 8 Independent Liberals received the coupon and 10 Lloyd George Liberals did not, the actual number of the Asquith faction was 27. Another historian puts the Asquith faction at 36 seats, of whom nine of these MPs subsequently joined the Coalition Liberal group. The remainder became bitter enemies of Lloyd George. Asquith's biographer Stephen Koss accepts that, although accounts differ as to the exact numbers, around 29 uncouponed Liberals had been elected. On 3 February 1919, 23 non-coalition Liberals formed themselves into a "Free Liberal" group (soon known as the "Wee Frees" after a Scottish religious sect of that name); they accepted Asquith's appointment of Sir Donald Maclean as chairman in his absence. After a brief attempt to set up a joint committee with the Coalition Liberal MPs, the "Wee Frees" resigned the government whip on 4 April, although some Liberal MPs still remained of uncertain allegiance. Maclean served as Leader of the Opposition until Asquith returned at a by-election in February 1920.

The Labour Party greatly increased its vote share and surpassed the total votes of either faction of the Liberal party, but they lacked an official leader. Labour could only slightly increase their number of seats, however, from 42 to 57 and some of their earlier leaders including Ramsay MacDonald and Arthur Henderson lost their seats. Labour won the most seats in Wales (which had previously been dominated by the Liberals) for the first time, a feat it has continued to the present day.

The Conservative MPs included record numbers of corporate directors, bankers and businessmen, while Labour MPs were mostly from the working class. Bonar Law himself symbolised the change in the type of a Conservative MP as he was a Presbyterian Canadian-born Scottish businessman who became, in the words of his biographer Robert Blake, the leader of "the Party of Old England, the Party of the Anglican Church and the country squire, the party of broad acres and hereditary titles". Bonar Law's ascent as leader of the Conservatives marked a shift in Conservative leaders from the aristocrats who generally led the party in the 19th century to a more middle class leadership who usually led the party in the 20th century. Many young veterans reacted against the harsh tone of the campaign and became disillusioned with politics.

Ireland

In Ireland, the Irish Parliamentary Party, which favoured Home Rule within the United Kingdom, lost almost all their seats, most of which were won by Sinn Féin under Éamon de Valera, which called for independence. The executions of many of the leaders of the Easter uprising of 1916, the force-feeding of those imprisoned in connection with the uprising who had gone on a hunger strike in 1917, and the Conscription Crisis of 1918 all served to alienate Irish Catholic opinion from the United Kingdom. The Sinn Féin candidates had promised on the campaign trail to win an Irish republic "by any means necessary", which was a code-word for violence, though it is not entirely clear if all Irish voters understood what the phrase meant. The 73 Sinn Féin elected members declined to take their seats in the British House of Commons, sitting instead in the Irish revolutionary assembly, the Dáil Éireann. On 17 May 1918 almost the entire leadership of Sinn Féin, including de Valera and Arthur Griffith, had been arrested. In total 47 of the Sinn Féin MPs were elected from jail. The Dáil first convened on 21 January 1919, which marks the beginning of the Irish War of Independence.

In the six Ulster counties that became Northern Ireland, Unionists consolidated their position by winning 23 out of the 30 seats. Cardinal Michael Logue brokered a pact in eight seats (one, East Donegal, not in the six counties), after nominations closed, where Catholic voters were instructed to vote for one particular nationalist party. Split evenly, the Irish Parliamentary Party won four of those seats and Sinn Féin three. (The pact failed in East Down). Joseph Devlin, memorably, also won Belfast (Falls) for the Irish Parliamentary Party in a straight fight with Éamon de Valera of Sinn Féin.

Constance Markievicz became the first woman elected to Parliament and also to the Dáil Éireann. She was a Sinn Féin member elected for Dublin St Patrick's, and like the other Sinn Féin MPs, did not take her seat at Westminster.

Women candidates

The seventeen women candidates were:
Margery Corbett Ashby, aged 36, Liberal, Birmingham, Ladywood
Winnifred Carney, aged 31, Sinn Féin, Belfast, Victoria
Charlotte Despard, aged 74, Labour, Battersea, North
Norah Dacre Fox, aged 40, Independent, Richmond
Alison Vickers Garland, aged 56, Liberal, Portsmouth South
Emmeline Pethick-Lawrence, aged 51, Labour, Manchester, Rusholme
Alice Lucas, aged 65, Conservative, Lambeth, Kennington
Mary Macarthur (Mrs W. C. Anderson), aged 38, Labour, Stourbridge, Worcestershire
Violet Markham (Mrs Carruthers), aged 46, Independent Liberal, Mansfield, Nottinghamshire
Edith How Martyn, aged 43, Independent Progressive, Hendon, Middlesex
Janet McEwan, aged 58, Liberal, Enfield, Middlesex
Millicent Mackenzie, 55, Labour, University of Wales
Constance Markievicz, aged 50, Sinn Féin, Dublin, St. Patrick's (elected)
Eunice Murray, aged 41, Independent, Glasgow, Bridgetown
Christabel Pankhurst, aged 38, Women's Party, Smethwick
Emily Phipps, aged 53, Independent Progressive, Chelsea
Ray Strachey, aged 31, Independent, Brentford and Isleworth, Middlesex

Results

Seats by party

|colspan=12 bgcolor=#E0E0E0 align="center"|Coalition Government

|-
|colspan=1 bgcolor=#efefef align="left"|
|colspan=1 bgcolor=#efefef align="left"| Coalition Government (total)
|colspan=1 bgcolor=#efefef align="right"| David Lloyd George
|colspan=1 bgcolor=#efefef align="right"| 614
|colspan=1 bgcolor=#efefef align="right"| 520
|colspan=1 bgcolor=#efefef align="right"|
|colspan=1 bgcolor=#efefef align="right"|
|colspan=1 bgcolor=#efefef align="right"|+249
|colspan=1 bgcolor=#efefef align="right"| 73.6
|colspan=1 bgcolor=#efefef align="right"| 53.0
|colspan=1 bgcolor=#efefef align="right"| 5,529,441
|colspan=1 bgcolor=#efefef align="right"| +6.4
|-
|colspan=12 bgcolor=#E0E0E0 align="center"|Non-Coalition parties

|}

Votes summary

Seats summary

Maps

Transfers of seats 
 All comparisons are with the December 1910 election.
In some cases the change is due to the MP defecting to the gaining party. Such circumstances are marked with a *.
In other circumstances the change is due to the seat having been won by the gaining party in a by-election in the intervening years, and then retained in 1918. Such circumstances are marked with a †.

See also
1920 United States elections, the first held after the passage of the 19th amendment allowed American women to vote
United Kingdom general elections
List of MPs elected in the 1918 United Kingdom general election
Parliamentary franchise in the United Kingdom 1885–1918, for details of the franchises replaced by the ones used in 1918
1918 Irish general election

Notes

References

Further reading

 Adelman, Paul. The Decline of the Liberal Party 1910–1931 (2014).

Hallam, David J.A., Taking on the Men: the first women parliamentary candidates 1918, Studley 2018
 Hilson, Mary. "Women voters and the rhetoric of patriotism in the British general election of 1918" Women's History Review 10.2 (2001): 325–347.
 

 McGill, Barry. "Lloyd George's Timing of the 1918 Election." Journal of British Studies 14.1 (1974): 109–124.

External links

Spartacus: Political Parties and Election Results
United Kingdom election results—summary results 1885–1979

Manifestos
1918 Conservative manifesto
1918 Labour manifesto
1918 Liberal manifesto
1918 Sinn Féin manifesto

 
1918
General election
United Kingdom general election
General election
Bonar Law
David Lloyd George
Éamon de Valera
H. H. Asquith